Conciliarism was a reform movement in the 14th-, 15th- and 16th-century Catholic Church which held that supreme authority in the Church resided with an ecumenical council, apart from, or even against, the pope.

The movement emerged in response to the Western Schism between rival popes in Rome and Avignon. The schism inspired the summoning of the Council of Pisa (1409), which failed to end the schism, and the Council of Constance (1414–1418), which succeeded and proclaimed its own superiority over the Pope. Conciliarism reached its apex with the Council of Basel (1431–1449), which ultimately fell apart. The eventual victor in the conflict was the institution of the papacy, confirmed by the condemnation of conciliarism at the Fifth Lateran Council, 1512–17. The final gesture, the doctrine of papal infallibility, was not promulgated until the First Vatican Council of 1870.

Conciliar theory 
William of Ockham (d. 1349) wrote some of the earliest documents outlining the basic understanding of conciliarism. His goal in these writings was removal of Pope John XXII, who had revoked a decree favoring ideas of the Spiritual Franciscans about Christ and the apostles owning nothing individually or in common. Some of his arguments include that the election by the faithful, or their representatives, confers the position of pope and further limits the papal authority. The universal church is a congregation of the faithful, not the Catholic Church, which was promised to the Apostles by Jesus. While the universal Church cannot fall into heresy, it is known that the Pope has fallen into heresy in the past.

Conciliar theory has its roots and foundations in both history and theology, arguing that many of the most important decisions of the Catholic Church have been made through conciliar means, beginning with the First Council of Nicaea (325). Conciliarism also drew on corporate theories of the church, which allowed the head to be restrained or judged by the members when his actions threatened the welfare of the whole ecclesial body. The canonists and theologians who advocated conciliar superiority drew on the same sources used by Marsilius and Ockham, but they used them in a more conservative way. They wanted to unify, defend and reform the institution under clerical control, not advance a Franciscan or a lay agenda. Among the theorists of this more clerical conciliarism were Jean Gerson, Pierre d'Ailly and Francesco Zabarella. Nicholas of Cusa synthesized this strain of conciliarism, balancing hierarchy with consent and representation of the faithful.

In his Defensor Pacis (1324), Marsilius of Padua agreed with William of Ockham that the universal Church is a church of the faithful, not the priests. Marsilius focused on the idea that the inequality of the priesthood has no divine basis and that Jesus, not the pope, is the only head of the Catholic Church.

John Kilcullen wrote, in the Stanford Encyclopedia of Philosophy, that "in France conciliarism was one of the sources of Gallicanism."

Opposition to conciliarism 
Many members of the Church continued to believe that the pope, as the successor of Saint Peter, retained the supreme governing authority in the Church. Juan de Torquemada defended papal supremacy in his Summa de ecclesia, completed ca. 1453. A generation later, Thomas Cajetan vigorously defended papal authority in his On the comparison of the authority of pope and council. He wrote that "Peter alone had the vicariate of Jesus Christ and only he received the power of jurisdiction immediately from Christ in an ordinary way, so that the others (the Apostles) were to receive it from him in the ordinary course of the law and were subject to him," and that "it must be demonstrated that Christ gave the plenitude of ecclesiastical power not to the community of the Church but to a single person in it."

Pope Pius II was a major opponent of conciliarism. According to Michael de la Bédoyère, "Pius II [...] [insisted] that the doctrine holding General Councils of the Church to be superior to the Pope was heretical." Pius II's bull Execrabilis condemned conciliarism.

Pope Pius VII condemned the conciliarist writings of Germanos Adam on June 3, 1816.

Modern conciliarism 
Although conciliarist strains of thought remain within the Church, Rome and the teaching of the Catholic Church maintains that the Pope is the Vicar of Christ on earth, and has the authority to issue infallible statements. This papal infallibility was invoked in Pope Pius IX's 1854 definition of the dogma of the Immaculate Conception of Mary, and Pope Pius XII's 1950 definition of the dogma of the Assumption of Mary.

A new interest in conciliarism was awakened in Catholic Church circles with the convocation of the Second Vatican Council.

See also 

 Haec sancta
 Anticurialism
 Ultramontanism

References

Sources

Further reading 

 

 
 
 
 

Catholic ecclesiology
15th-century Christianity

15th-century Catholicism
Papal primacy